Choi Won-nam (born 5 October 1969) is a North Korean former footballer. He represented North Korea on at least twenty-one occasions between 1991 and 1993, scoring five goals.

Career statistics

International

International goals
Scores and results list North Korea's goal tally first, score column indicates score after each North Korea goal.

References

1969 births
Living people
North Korean footballers
North Korea international footballers
Association football forwards
1992 AFC Asian Cup players